Leif Hermann (11 August 1941 – 13 March 2022) was a Danish politician. A member of the Socialist People's Party, he served in the Folketing from 1984 to 1990. He died in Amager on 13 March 2022, at the age of 80.

References

1941 births
2022 deaths
Socialist People's Party (Denmark) politicians
20th-century Danish women politicians
Members of the Folketing
University of Copenhagen alumni
People from Gentofte Municipality
Women members of the Folketing